VA255 may refer to:
 Ariane flight VA255, an Ariane 5 launch
 Virgin Australia flight 255, with IATA flight number VA255
 Virginia State Route 255 (SR 255 or VA-255), a primary state highway in the United States